Evans Piedmont Glacier is a broad ice sheet occupying the low-lying coastal platform between Tripp Island and Cape Archer in Victoria Land. It was circumnavigated in 1957 by the New Zealand Northern Survey Party of the Commonwealth Trans-Antarctic Expedition, 1956–58, and was named after Petty Officer Edgar Evans, Royal Navy, of the British Antarctic Expedition, 1910–13, who was one of the South Pole Party under Captain Scott, and who lost his life on the Beardmore Glacier on the return journey.

References 

Glaciers of Victoria Land
Scott Coast